Khalili Rural District is a rural district (dehestan) in the Central District of Gerash County, Fars Province, Iran. At the 2016 census, its population was 3,720 in 937 families.  The rural district has 9 villages.

References 

Rural Districts of Fars Province
Gerash County